Guildfordia superba, common name the superb star turban, is a species of sea snail, a marine gastropod mollusk in the family Turbinidae, the turban snails.

Description
The size of the shell attains 80 mm.

Distribution
This marine species occurs off the Philippines.

References

 Poppe G.T., Tagaro S. & Dekker H. (2005) Discovery of a new Guildfordia (Gastropoda, Turbinidae) near Balut Island, south of Mindanao, The Philippines. Visaya 1(3): 4-10
 Alf A. & Kreipl K. (2011) The family Turbinidae. Subfamilies Turbininae Rafinesque, 1815 and Prisogasterinae Hickman & McLean, 1990. In: G.T. Poppe & K. Groh (eds), A Conchological Iconography. Hackenheim: Conchbooks. pp. 1–82, pls 104-245

External links
 

superba
Gastropods described in 2005